Lycurgus Luther Marshall (July 9, 1888 – January 12, 1958) was an American lawyer and politician who served one term as a U.S. Representative from Ohio from 1939 to 1941.

Biography 
Born in Bucyrus, Ohio, Marshall attended the public schools, and graduated from Ohio Wesleyan University, Delaware, Ohio, in 1909 and from the law department of Western Reserve University, Cleveland, Ohio, in 1915. He was admitted to the bar in 1915 and commenced practice in Cleveland, Ohio.

Political career 
He served as member of the Ohio House of Representatives in 1921 and 1922, and in the Ohio State Senate from 1923 to 1935. He also served as member of the Euclid (Ohio) School Board for eight years.

Marshall was elected as a Republican to the Seventy-sixth Congress (January 3, 1939 – January 3, 1941).
He was an unsuccessful candidate for reelection in 1940 to the Seventy-seventh Congress, and thereafter resumed the practice of law.

Death 
He died in Aurora, Ohio, January 12, 1958, and was interred in Lake View Cemetery, Cleveland, Ohio.

Sources

1888 births
1958 deaths
American Lutherans
People from Bucyrus, Ohio
Politicians from Cleveland
Ohio lawyers
Burials at Lake View Cemetery, Cleveland
Case Western Reserve University School of Law alumni
Ohio Wesleyan University alumni
Republican Party members of the Ohio House of Representatives
Republican Party Ohio state senators
Lawyers from Cleveland
20th-century American politicians
20th-century American lawyers
20th-century Lutherans
Republican Party members of the United States House of Representatives from Ohio